Stanisław Mikulski (1 May 1929 – 27 November 2014) was a Polish theatre, television and film actor, and host of Koło Fortuny (the Polish version of Wheel of Fortune).

Mikulski gained fame for his leading role in the 1967–68 television series Stawka większa niż życie. As a result of being typecast as Hans Kloss, he moved his focus toward theatre work. In 1983 he was a member of the jury at the 13th Moscow International Film Festival.

Selected filmography
 Godziny nadziei (1955)
 Kanał (1957)
 Ewa chce spać (1957)
 Dwaj panowie N (1961)
 Ostatni kurs (1963)
Skąpani w ogniu (1963)
Powrót na ziemię (1966)
Stawka większa niż życie (1967-1968)
Ostatni świadek (1969)
Samochodzik i templariusze (1971)
Zaczarowane podwórko (1974)
Sekret Enigmy (1979)
Miś (1980)

References

External links

Stanisław Mikulski at www.culture.pl (in Polish)

1929 births
2014 deaths
20th-century Polish male actors
Actors from Łódź
Polish male film actors
Polish male stage actors
Polish male television actors
Polish television presenters
Officers of the Order of Polonia Restituta
Recipients of the Order of Polonia Restituta (1944–1989)
Deaths from cancer in Poland
Recipient of the Meritorious Activist of Culture badge